The Cabinet of Alejandro Maldonado was the forty-ninth cabinet of Guatemala.

The cabinet took office on 3 September 2015 and ended on 14 January 2016.

Composition

References

Politics of Guatemala
Government of Guatemala